Kingdom Under Fire: A War of Heroes is a real-time strategy video game developed by Phantagram and published by Gathering of Developers. Released for Windows in 2001, the game is based in a high fantasy setting and is played from an overhead isometric perspective. The game included single-player and multiplayer online modes through Phantagram's Wargate server. The game is the first release in the Kingdom Under Fire series, which later received critical acclaim through the Xbox release Kingdom Under Fire: The Crusaders, a game which, like others in the series, incorporated both role-playing and real-time strategy elements. A "Gold Patch" was released for Kingdom Under Fire which introduced a map editor, extra missions, and in-game save option; this version was also re-released as Kingdom Under Fire Gold.

Gameplay
Two factions, light and dark, are playable in the game, with each side having units fulfilling the typical roles of warrior, archer, flying unit and wizards – as well as more powerful individual hero characters. The campaigns are split into 13 missions of which 10 are battles and the other three being a dungeon crawl for a hero character. Skirmish and multiplayer modes were also supported, with online games with human opponents organized via the Wargate.Net server.

Plot
Kingdom Under Fire is set in the fantasy land of Bersia and covers the struggle between the forces of light (Humans, Dwarves, and Elves) and the forces of dark (Ogres, Orcs, Undead, and others). One hundred years before the events of the game, an epic war was waged between the two forces until finally a legendary group known as the Knights of Xok defeated the forces of dark and brought peace to the land of Bersia.

Reception
In the United States, Kingdom Under Fire sold 20,000 copies by October 2001. Preorders reached 250,000 units in South Korea before its release.

John Lee reviewed the PC version of the game for Next Generation, rating it three stars out of five, and stated that "A potential treasure cruise for gamers, Kingdom missed the boat by a hair."

The game received mixed or average reviews on the review aggregator websites Metacritic and GameRankings, with both very positive and negative responses from critics. The hero missions were unfavourably compared with Blizzard's Diablo games. The difficulty was claimed to be too high by some reviewers, with hero units unbalanced and the game's AI also found lacking. The game's graphics were considered good or passable, though the animations limited, but the audio and story were praised by critics.

References

External links
, Official website
, Official game page (archived)

2001 video games
Gathering of Developers games
Real-time strategy video games
Video games developed in South Korea
Video games with isometric graphics
Windows games
Multiplayer and single-player video games
Phantagram games